"Holiday Song" is the second season premiere of the TV anthology series Goodyear Playhouse. It was written by Paddy Chayefsky and helped establish his reputation in TV drama.

The episode was based on a story which had appeared in Reader's Digest.

References

External links
 

1952 American television episodes
Works by Paddy Chayefsky
Television anthology episodes
Television episodes directed by Delbert Mann